Lucas Van den Eynde (born 23 February 1959) is a Belgian actor. He has acted in theater films and television programs and also dubbed animated films in Belgian Dutch. 

In 1998 he was the recipient of the Arlecchino Award (the award presented annually by the VSCD to the best supporting actor of the Dutch theater season) for his role as Edwaar in Ten Oorlog, which was followed by the 1999 Louis d'Or for his lead role as Bruno in Bruno in De cocu magnifique oftewel de wonderbaarlijke hoorndrager.

In 2013 he appeared in Salamander.

Work

De Baere was also the closing party of the "50 years of Flemish Television" (Dutch: 50 jaar Vlaamse Televisie) festival.

From 2004 Van den Eynde played a leading role in the police series , that of sergeant . He played this character for four seasons, but left the series in 2008 to focus more on stage and musical projects that year. Van den Eynde was briefly seen in a guest appearance during the fifth season of the series. In 2014, he reprised the role of Guido Versavel in the five concluding episodes of the last season.

At the end of 2008, Van den Eynde played in the musical  (Studio 100), in which he played the title role. In 2009 he played the butcher André Vangenechten in the television series Van Vlees en Bloed, a character that came to be known as the bospoeper. Van den Eynde played a prominent role in the highly successful television series Salamander in 2013, as Carl Cassimon.

In 1998 he received an Arlecchino from the VSCD in the Netherlands for his role as Edwaar in Ten Oorlog. In 1999 the Louis d'Or followed for his lead role as Bruno in Bruno in De cocu magnifique oftewel de wonderbaarlijke hoorndrager.

Personal life
Van den Eynde got married in 2005 and together with his wife Sofie he has a daughter, Flore, born in 2003 and a son, Lou, born in 2008.

Filmography

Film

Television

Voice roles

Dubbing roles

Animated films

Awards and nominations

References

External links

Lucas Van den Eynde in the database of the Flemish Institute for the Performing Arts

1959 births
Living people
Belgian male film actors
Belgian male television actors
Belgian male voice actors
Flemish male film actors
Flemish male television actors
Flemish male voice actors
People from Lier, Belgium